Lake Karum (also known as Lake Assale or Asale) is a salt lake in the Afar Region of Ethiopia. The volcano Erta Ale rises southeast of this lake.

Werner Munzinger, who traveled through the Afar Depression in 1867, recorded that this lake was fed by four streams: The Didic, the Ala, the Rira Guddy, and the Ragali or Awra, which is the only permanent stream flowing into Lake Karum.

North of Lake Karum is the former mining-settlement of Dallol. The lake is extremely salty and is surrounded by a salt-pan, which is still mined. The salt is transported by caravan to the rest of the country.

See also
Lake Afrera
Lake Assal (Djibouti)

References

Afar Region
Lakes of Ethiopia
Saline lakes of the Great Rift Valley